The women's tournament of basketball at the 2009 Summer Universiade at Belgrade, Serbia began on July 1 and ended on July 11.

Teams

Format
 16 participating team are drawn into four groups of four teams (A, B, C, and D). Each group will use the single round robin system.
 Following preliminary round pool play, teams will be seeded for second-round games based on their pool standings. The top two finishing teams from each pool advance to play for 1st - 8th place. The third and fourth place teams will compete in the classification for 9th  -16th place.
 1st and 2nd placed teams of each group from the preliminary will be divided into four groups (E,F G, and H) of four teams. Each group will use the single round robin system. The results of the games between the two teams involved in the preliminary will be carried over.

Preliminary round

Group A

Group B

Group C

Group D

Intermediate Round

Group E

Group F

Group G

Group E

Classification round

Classification 13-16 places

Classification 9-12 places

Classification 5-8 places

Semifinals

Finals

Final 15-16 places

Final 13-14 places

Final 11-12 places

Final 9-10 places

Final 7-8 places

Final 5-6 places

Bronze-medal game

Final

Final standings

References

External links
Reports

Basketball at the 2009 Summer Universiade
Universiade
2009